14 Mai is a residential district of Satu Mare in Romania. It is named after the date of the devastating floods that affected the city in 1970.

References

 
Districts of Satu Mare